Rose Hill Cemetery is located in Texarkana, Texas, with over 3700 graves.

Notable burials

 Poindexter Dunn (1834–1914), U.S. House of Representatives member from Arkansas
 Robert Lee Henry (1864–1931), U.S. House of Representatives member from Texas
 John Levi Sheppard (1852–1902), U.S. House of Representatives member from Texas
 Howell Washington Runnels Sr. (1867–1927), Texas House of Representatives member

External links
 
   

Cemeteries in Texas